Satoshi Kon: The Illusionist is a 2021 documentary film directed by Pascal-Alex Vincent. The film celebrates the legacy of Japanese anime director Satoshi Kon. The production features interviews with animators, voice actors, producers, directors, and writers who worked with Kon during his career.

Premise
The film is a documentary on the career of Japanese anime director Satoshi Kon, who is often regarded as one of the leading figures in animation. The film follows the growth of Kon's career from his debut film Perfect Blue (1997) to his unfinished production The Dreaming Machine. The documentary features interviews from his collaborators, including animators, animation historians, voice actors, producers, directors, and writers. The cast includes Darren Aronofsky, Marc Caro, Mamoru Oshii, and Rodney Rothman.

Featured cast of subjects
 Darren Aronofsky 
 Marc Caro
 
 Megumi Hayashibara
 Mamoru Hosoda
 Junko Iwao
 Mamoru Oshii
 Rodney Rothman
 Aya Suzuki
 Sadayuki Murai
 Masao Maruyama
 Masashi Ando
 Hiroyuki Okiura

Reception

Critical response 
On Rotten Tomatoes, the documentary holds an approval rating of 100% based on 15 reviews, with an average rating of 7.70/10.

Reviewing for Anime News Network, Alicia Haddick called it "a highly engaging documentary filled with high-profile interviews on an interesting subject". Richard Whittaker of Austin Chronicle commended Pascal-Alex Vincent for portraying the "complicated threads and fascinations that wove Kon's curtailed filmography", and described the film as "overdue tribute to one of the greats of animation". According to Courtney Small of POV Magazine, the film "works best when viewed as a tasty appetizer that whets one's appetite for diving into Kon's meaty canon of films". Film critic Reuben Baron of Comic Book Resources hailed the film as "a quality tribute" to the anime director.

References

External links
 

2021 films
2021 documentary films
Films directed by Pascal-Alex Vincent
2020s English-language films